Roy West may refer to:

 Roy Owen West (1868–1958), Chicago politician and U.S. Secretary of the Interior
 Roy West (footballer) (1941–2011), Australian rules footballer